Yvonne Alix Hackenbroch (1912–2012), was a British museum curator and historian of jewellery.

Early life
Yvonne Alix Hackenbroch was born in Frankfurt am Main, Germany, on 27 April 1912, the second of three daughters of the art dealer Zacharias Max Hackenbroch (1884–1937) and his wife, Clementine Hackenbroch, née Schwarzschild (1888–1984), a descendant of art dealer Selig Goldschmidt. Whilst still a child, Hackenbroch was fluent in French, English, German, and Italian.

Hackenbroch was educated at the Ludwig Maximilian University of Munich, and earned an 
undergraduate degree and a doctorate, both in the history of art. She was the last Jew to earn a PhD there before the Second World War, in December 1936.

Career
On arriving in London, Hackenbroch soon joined the staff at the British Museum, and was one of those who excavated and catalogued the Sutton Hoo treasure. She was the jewellery adviser to the 1944 film of Henry V, starring Laurence Olivier.

From 1946 to 1949, Hackenbroch was based in Toronto, Canada, at the behest of the UK government, to provide expert advice on the Lee Collection of Renaissance art given to Canada by Arthur Lee, 1st Viscount Lee of Fareham, to thank the country for its World War II support.

In about 1949, she moved to the Metropolitan Museum of Art in New York to catalogue the  
"immense art collection" of Irwin Untermyer. This led to Hackenbroch and Thames & Hudson publishing seven books, covering antique silver, bronze, porcelain, needlework and furniture. She joined the Metropolitan Museum of Art as a curator, specialising in Renaissance Art, and eventually became an American citizen.

Selected publications
 Renaissance Jewellery (1979)

Personal life
She never married.

Later life
Hackenbroch died on 7 September 2012, in her flat at 31 Hyde Park Gardens, Bayswater, London, four months after celebrating her 100th birthday.

References

1912 births
2012 deaths
British curators
British women curators
People from Frankfurt
Ludwig Maximilian University of Munich alumni
British centenarians
People associated with the Metropolitan Museum of Art
British women writers
Jewish women writers
Women centenarians
Recipients of the Cross of the Order of Merit of the Federal Republic of Germany
Jewish emigrants from Nazi Germany to the United Kingdom